Colin Scott Holderman (born October 8, 1995) is an American professional baseball pitcher for the Pittsburgh Pirates of Major League Baseball (MLB). He made his MLB debut in 2022 with the New York Mets.

Amateur career
Holderman graduated from Bradley-Bourbonnais Community High School in Bradley, Illinois, in 2014. He enrolled at Southern Illinois University to play college baseball for the Southern Illinois Salukis. After one year, he transferred to Heartland Community College. He was named the National Junior College Athletic Association's Division II Baseball Player of the Year. Holderman committed to transfer to Mississippi State University after his year at Heartland.

Professional career

New York Mets
The New York Mets selected Holderman in the ninth round of the 2016 MLB draft and he signed with the Mets rather than transfer to Mississippi State. He began his professional career with the Kingsport Mets of the Rookie-level Appalachian League. He began the 2017 season with the Columbia Fireflies of the Class A South Atlantic League, but underwent Tommy John surgery on April 4, 2018. He missed the 2018 season while recovering from the surgery and the 2020 season due to the COVID-19 pandemic.

In 2021, Holderman pitched for the Binghamton Rumble Ponies of the Class AA Eastern League. He had a 3.38 earned run average (ERA) and served as Binghamton's closer. Assigned to the Arizona Fall League after the regular season, he had a 8.71 ERA in 11 games and the Mets opted not to add Holderman to their 40-man roster to protect him from the Rule 5 draft. He began the 2022 season with the Syracuse Mets of the Class AAA International League. The Mets promoted Holderman to the major leagues on May 15, 2022. He made his major league debut that afternoon at Citi Field and pitched a scoreless ninth inning against the Seattle Mariners.

Pittsburgh Pirates
On July 22, 2022, the Mets traded Holderman to the Pittsburgh Pirates for Daniel Vogelbach. The Pirates assigned him to the Triple-A Indianapolis Indians.

References

External links

Living people
1995 births
People from Bourbonnais, Illinois
Baseball players from Illinois
Major League Baseball pitchers
New York Mets players
Pittsburgh Pirates players
Southern Illinois Salukis baseball players
Kingsport Mets players
Columbia Fireflies players
Gulf Coast Mets players
Brooklyn Cyclones players
St. Lucie Mets players
Binghamton Rumble Ponies players
Salt River Rafters players
Syracuse Mets players
Indianapolis Indians players